The Georgia Southern Eagles men's soccer program represents Georgia Southern University in all NCAA Division I men's college soccer competitions. Founded in 1980, the Eagles currently compete in the Sun Belt Conference (SBC). They played briefly as members of the Mid-American Conference. However, following a major conference realignment in 2021 brought several new men's soccer schools to the SBC including the Southeastern Conference and Big 12 Conference playing members, the league announced it would reinstate men's soccer no later than 2023. The reinstatement of SBC men's soccer was ultimately pushed forward to 2022.

The Eagles are coached by LEE SQUIRES. Georgia Southern plays their home matches at Eagle Field.

History 
Georgia Southern University's varsity men's soccer program was introduced by then-athletic
director George A. Cook on May 7, 1980. The same day, the soccer program's first head coach, Pat Cobb, was also introduced as the head coach. They began play in the league now known as the ASUN Conference.

Seasons

Head coaches 
There have been seven men's soccer coaches in the program's history.

Rivalries

Mercer 
Mercer leads the series 25–24–0 through the 2018 season.

Georgia State

Georgia State leads the series 30–11–6 through the 2020–21 season.

References

External links 
 

 
1980 establishments in Georgia (U.S. state)
Soccer clubs in Georgia (U.S. state)